Alessandro Nunziati (born 16 September 1972), better known by his stage name Lord Vampyr, is an Italian musician, record producer and writer, famous for being the former vocalist of the gothic metal band Theatres des Vampires, as well as one of its founding members.

Biography
Nunziati was born in Rome, Italy on 16 September 1972. As a teenager, he studied accounting and computer programming at the II° liceo artistico di Roma, and also graduated in Psychology at the Sapienza University of Rome. His first musical ventures were with the death-doom band Sepolcrum, formed in 1988 and of which he served as the vocalist. Sepolcrum released three demo tapes before changing its musical style to thrash metal and its name to VII Arcano in 1995. In 1994, after recording a last extended play with VII Arcano that would be released in the following year, Nunziati left the band to form Theatres des Vampires.

In 1995, Theatres des Vampires' first demo tape, Nosferatu, eine Simphonie des Gravens, was released. The tape got the attention of record label Garden of Grief, which released their first studio album, Vampyrìsme, Nècrophilie, Nècrosadisme, Nècrophagie, in the following year. It was also in 1995 when Nunziati first donned his stage name Lord Vampyr; at the time, though, it was written with an I – "Lord Vampir". (In The Vampire Chronicles however, he would introduce himself as Lord Vampyr Draculea; it was the only Theatres des Vampires album in which he did so.) Initially a raw black metal band, Theatres des Vampires' musical style would gradually shift to a cleaner and more "produced" gothic metal as time went by.

Nunziati left Theatres des Vampires in 2004, due to creative divergences between him and the rest of the band, and began pursuing a solo career. His first solo album, De Vampyrica Philosophia, was released in 2005; its musical style was a symphonic black metal reminiscent of the early Theatres des Vampires material. This musical direction would continue to his second album, Carpathian Tragedies, released in 2009. Beginning with his third album, 2010's Horror Masterpiece, Nunziati abandoned the symphonic black metal style of his previous albums to shift to a more industrial-inflected sonority. In the same year he also released a compilation containing two old extended plays of his, entitled Vampyria. In 2005 Nunziati also formed a side project named Lord Vampyr's Shadowsreign, that released only one EP and one studio album before disbanding in 2008, reuniting in 2009 and coming to an end again in 2010.

Nunziati also serves as the vocalist and guitarist of the bands Nailed God, Cain (under the pseudonym Lord Alexander) and Malamorte.

In 2009, Nunziati published his first novel, the thriller Male innocente (Italian for "Innocent Evil"), through Gruppo Albatros il Filo. It was never released outside Italy.

His fourth studio album, Gothika Vampyrika Heretika, was released in 2013.

He announced on his official Facebook in December 2016 that he is currently working on a new studio album titled Death Comes Under the Sign of the Cross.

The new album of Lord Vampyr is out in the digital stores (November 2018) and on cd (December 2018) for Sleaszy Rider Records.

November 2018: Rockshots Records signed a worldwide deal with Malamorte. The new album will be titled "Hell for All" and will be out 25 January 2019 (Europe) and 8 February 2019 (North America)
2019: Malamorte signed a contract with Revalve Records, the new album "God Needs Evil" will be out 21st February 2020.
September 2020: Malamorte signed a new contract with the label Moribund Records from USA.

Discography

With VII Arcano
 1990: Anteroom of the Hell (demo tape – as Sepolcrum) 
 1992: Flowers Upon the Grave (demo tape – as Sepolcrum) 
 1994: Promo 1994 (demo tape – as Sepolcrum)
 1995: Gather My Blood Forever (EP)

With Theatres des Vampires
 1995: Nosferatu, eine Simphonie des Gravens (demo tape)
 1996: Vampyrìsme, Nècrophilie, Nècrosadisme, Nècrophagie
 1999: The Vampire Chronicles
 2001: Iubilaeum Anno Dracula 2001 (EP)
 2001: Bloody Lunatic Asylum
 2002: Suicide Vampire
 2003: Vampyrìsme...
 2004: Nightbreed of Macabria

Solo
 2005: De Vampyrica Philosophia
 2007: Blood Bathory (EP)
 2009: Carpathian Tragedies
 2010: Horror Masterpiece
 2010: Vampyria (compilation)
 2013: Gothika Vampyrika Heretika
 2019: Death Comes Under the Sign of the Cross
 2021: The Vampire's Legacy

With Cain
 See Cain (Italian band)#Discography

With Malamorte
 2014: The Fall of Babylon (EP)
 2016: Devilish Illusions
 2017: Satan Goes to Heaven to Destroy the Kingdom of God
 2019: Hell for All
 2020: " God Needs Evil"
 2021: " Mass Cult Suicide"
 2022: " Omen "

With Lord Vampyr's Shadowsreign
 See Lord Vampyr's Shadowsreign

With Nailed God
 2009: Glorification of the Unborn

Solo band members
Current members
 Lord Vampyr – vocals (2005–present)
 Diego Tasciotti – drums (2008–present)
 Ferenc Nádasdy – keyboards, bass (2011–present)
 Gabriele Martella – guitars  (2021–present)

Past members
 Giuseppe De Paolo – guitars  (2019–2020)
 Fabrizio Curcio – guitars (2017–2018)
 Andrea Taddei – guitars (2008–2021)
 Nighthorn (Silvano Leone) — bass (2005–2008)
 Aeshla (Francesco Struglia) — drums (2005–2008)
 Nepesh-Ra (Cristiano Trionfera) — guitars (2005–2008)
 S.K. — guitars (2005–2008)
 Alexiel – keyboards (2005–2008)
 Count Morgoth (Roberto Cufaro) — keyboards (2005)
 Endymion (Riccardo Studer) — keyboards (2008–2010)
 Lady Eter – female backing vocals (2008–2010)
 Prometherion (Fabio Palazzola) — guitars (2010–2011)
 Lady Noir (Mariachiara Castaldi) — female backing vocals (2010–2011)
 STN Zyklon (Michele Arnone) — guitars (2010–2014)
 Aerioch (Andrea di Nino) — bass (2008–2014)

References

External links
 

1972 births
Italian male singers
Italian singer-songwriters
Italian heavy metal musicians
Italian male novelists
21st-century Italian novelists
Thriller writers
Italian record producers
Living people
English-language singers from Italy
Sapienza University of Rome alumni
Singers from Rome
Black metal singers